David Alan Lindstrom (born November 16, 1954) is a former American football defensive end in the National Football League, playing eight seasons (1978–1986) for the Kansas City Chiefs. Drafted by the San Diego Chargers in 1977, Lindstrom was inducted into both the Boston University Hall of Fame and Massachusetts High School Hall of Fame in 1993.

Lindstrom served as the chairman of the Overland Park Visitors and Convention Bureau as well as a Kansas City Chiefs Ambassador. He has owned four Burger King restaurants in the Kansas City area. Lindstrom also serves as board chairman for the Kansas Turnpike Authority and as a member of Johnson County Community College’s Board of Trustees.

A Johnson County, Kansas resident since 1979, Lindstrom and Mary, his wife of 40 years, are parents of Halee and Adrienne.

2020 U.S. Senate campaign

Lindstrom launched his bid for the Republican nomination for the United States Senate with an event on June 27, 2019, at Goodland, Kansas in Kansas' northwestern corner (four-term GOP Sen. Pat Roberts is not seeking re-election in 2020). Entering the Senate race, Lindstrom stated he's concerned about what he sees as a growing embrace of socialism by people in Washington: “People are making promises with other people's money and resources that they cannot keep, that they understand are not sustainable — that will create an environment in this country, of one of entitlement, as opposed to hard work,” he said during an Associated Press interview, “That's what I mean when I talk about socialism.” He ended up getting 4th place in the votes during the primaries.

References

External links
Kansas City Ambassadors profile

1954 births
American football defensive ends
Boston University Terriers football players
Burger King people
Kansas City Chiefs players
Kansas Republicans
Living people
Sportspeople from Overland Park, Kansas
Politicians from Overland Park, Kansas
Players of American football from Massachusetts
Sportspeople from Cambridge, Massachusetts
Candidates in the 2020 United States Senate elections